Hydroxylammonium sulfate (NH3OH)2SO4, is the sulfuric acid salt of hydroxylamine. It is primarily used as an easily  handled form of hydroxylamine, which is explosive when pure.

Synthesis
Hydroxylammonium sulfate can be obtained by the acid-base reaction of hydroxylamine with sulfuric acid:

2NH2OH(aq) + H2SO4(aq) → (NH3OH)2SO4(aq)

Applications

Hydroxylammonium sulfate is used in organic synthesis to convert aldehydes and ketones to oximes, carboxylic acids and their derivatives (e.g. esters) to hydroxamic acids, isocyanates to N-hydroxyureas and nitriles to amidoximes. Hydroxylammonium sulfate is also used to generate hydroxylamine-O-sulfonic acid from oleum or chlorosulfuric acid.

Hydroxylammonium sulfate is used in the production of anti-skinning agents, pharmaceuticals, rubber, textiles, plastics and detergents. It is a radical scavenger that terminates radical polymerization reactions and serves as an antioxidant in natural rubber. (NH3OH)2SO4 is a starting material for some insecticides, herbicides and growth regulators. It is used in photography as a stabiliser for colour developers and as an additive in photographic emulsions in colour film.

Decomposition
At 120 °C, hydroxylammonium sulfate begins to decompose to sulfur trioxide, nitrous oxide, water, and ammonia:

2(NH3OH)2SO4 → 2SO3 + N2O + 2NH3 + 5H2O

The reaction is exothermic above 138 °C, and is most exothermic at 177 °C. Metals (especially copper, its alloys and its salts) catalyse the decomposition of hydroxylammonium sulfate. The instability of this compound is mainly due to the hydroxylammonium ion's weak nitrogen to oxygen single bond.

References

External links
International Chemical Safety Card 0898

Hydroxylammonium compounds
Sulfates
Photographic chemicals